Facio is a surname. Notable people with the surname include:

Alda Facio (born 1948), Costa Rican jurist, writer, and teacher 
Bartolomeo Facio, Italian historian, writer, and humanist
Giannina Facio, Costa Rican actress and producer
Lorena Clare Facio
Sara Facio (born 1932), Argentine photographer

See also
Faccio
Fatio